is a Japanese track and field athlete who competes in the pole vault. She won at the 2012 Japan Championships. She is Japanese record holder in the Women's pole vault. She competed in the Women's pole vault at the 2012 Summer Olympics.

Competition record

See also
List of pole vault national champions (women)
List of Asian Games medalists in athletics

References

External links
 
 JAAF profile for Tomomi Abiko

1988 births
Living people
Sportspeople from Shiga Prefecture
Japanese female pole vaulters
Olympic female pole vaulters
Olympic athletes of Japan
Athletes (track and field) at the 2012 Summer Olympics
Asian Games silver medalists for Japan
Asian Games bronze medalists for Japan
Asian Games medalists in athletics (track and field)
Athletes (track and field) at the 2010 Asian Games
Athletes (track and field) at the 2014 Asian Games
Medalists at the 2010 Asian Games
Medalists at the 2014 Asian Games
Japan Championships in Athletics winners
20th-century Japanese women
21st-century Japanese women